A deep geological repository is a way of storing hazardous or radioactive waste within a stable geologic environment (typically 200–1000 m deep). It entails a combination of waste form, waste package, engineered seals and geology that is suited to provide a high level of long-term isolation and containment without future maintenance. This will prevent any radioactive dangers. A number of mercury, cyanide and arsenic waste repositories are operating worldwide including Canada (Giant Mine) and Germany (potash mines in Herfa-Neurode and Zielitz) and a number of radioactive waste storages are under construction with the Onkalo in Finland being the most advanced.

Principles and background 
Highly toxic waste that cannot be further recycled must be stored in isolation to avoid contamination of air, ground and underground water. Deep geological repository is a type of long-term storage that isolates waste in geological structures that are expected to be stable for millions of years, with a number of natural and engineered barriers. Natural barriers include a water-impermeable (e.g. clay) and gas-impermeable (e.g. salt) layers of rock above and surrounding the underground storage. Engineered barriers include bentonite clay and cement.

The International Panel on Fissile Materials has said:
It is widely accepted that spent nuclear fuel and high-level reprocessing and plutonium wastes require well-designed storage for periods ranging from tens of thousands to a million years, to minimize releases of the contained radioactivity into the environment. Safeguards are also required to ensure that neither plutonium nor highly enriched uranium is diverted to weapon use. There is general agreement that placing spent nuclear fuel in repositories hundreds of meters below the surface would be safer than indefinite storage of spent fuel on the surface.

Common elements of repositories include the radioactive waste, the containers enclosing the waste, other engineered barriers or seals around the containers, the tunnels housing the containers, and the geologic makeup of the surrounding area.

A storage space hundreds of metres below the ground needs to withstand the effects of one or more future glaciations with thick ice sheets resting on top of the rock. The presence of ice sheets affects the hydrostatic pressure at repository depth, groundwater flow and chemistry, and the potential for earthquakes. This is being taken into consideration by organizations preparing for long-term waste repositories in Sweden, Finland, Canada and some other countries that also have to assess the effects of future glaciations.

Despite a long-standing agreement among many experts that geological disposal can be safe, technologically feasible and environmentally sound, a large part of the general public in many countries remains skeptical as result of anti-nuclear campaigns. One of the challenges facing the supporters of these efforts is to demonstrate confidently that a repository will contain wastes for so long that any releases that might take place in the future will pose no significant health or environmental risk.

Nuclear reprocessing does not eliminate the need for a repository, but reduces the volume, the long-term radiation hazard, and long-term heat dissipation capacity needed. Reprocessing does not eliminate the political and community challenges to repository siting.

Natural radioactive repositories 
Natural uranium ore deposits serve as proof of concept for stability of radioactive elements in geological formations — Cigar Lake Mine for example is a natural deposit of highly concentrated uranium ore located under sandstone and quartz layer at depth of 450 m that is 1 billion years old with no radioactive leaks to the surface.
The ability of natural geologic barriers to isolate radioactive waste is demonstrated by the natural nuclear fission reactors at Oklo, Gabon. During their long reaction period about 5.4 tonnes of fission products as well as 1.5 tonnes of plutonium together with other transuranic elements were generated in the uranium ore body. This plutonium and the other transuranics remained immobile until the present day, a span of almost 2 billion years. This is quite remarkable in view of the fact that ground water had ready access to the deposits and they were not in a chemically inert form, such as glass.

Research 

Deep geologic disposal has been studied for several decades, including laboratory tests, exploratory boreholes, and the construction and operation of underground research laboratories where large-scale in-situ tests are being conducted. Major underground test facilities are listed below.

Nuclear repository sites

Status of repository at certain sites 

The process of selecting appropriate deep final repositories is now under way in several countries with the first expected to be commissioned some time after 2010.

Australia
There was a proposal for an international high level waste repository in Australia and Russia. However, since the proposal for a global repository in Australia (which has never produced nuclear power, and has one research reactor) was raised, domestic political objections have been loud and sustained, making such a facility in Australia unlikely.

Canada 

Giant Mine has been used as deep repository for storage of highly toxic arsenic waste in the form of powder. As of 2020 there is ongoing research to reprocess the waste into a frozen block form which is more chemically stable and prevents water contamination.

Finland
The Onkalo site in Finland based on the KBS-3 technology, is the furthest along the road to becoming operational among repositories worldwide. Posiva started construction of the site in 2004. The Finnish government issued the company a licence for constructing the final disposal facility on 12 November 2015.  continuous delays mean that Posiva now expects operations to begin in 2023.

Germany
A number of repositories including potash mines in Herfa-Neurode and Zielitz have been already used for years for storage of highly toxic mercury, cyanide and arsenic waste. There is little debate in Germany regarding toxic waste in spite of the fact that unlike nuclear waste it does not lose toxicity with time.

There is a debate about the search for a final repository for radioactive waste, accompanied by  protests, especially in the Gorleben village in the Wendland area, which was seen ideal for the final repository until 1990 because of its location in a remote, economically depressed corner of West Germany, next to the closed border to the former East Germany. After reunification, the village is now close to the center of the country, and is currently used for temporary storage of nuclear waste. The pit Asse II is a former salt mine in the mountain range of Asse in Lower Saxony/Germany, that was allegedly used as a research mine since 1965. Between 1967 and 1978 radioactive waste was placed in storage. Research indicated that brine contaminated with radioactive caesium-137, plutonium and strontium was leaking from the mine since 1988 but was not reported until June 2008
The repository for radioactive waste Morsleben is a deep geological repository for radioactive waste in the rock salt mine Bartensleben in Morsleben, in Saxony-Anhalt/Germany that was used from 1972–1998. Since 2003  of salt-concrete has been pumped into the pit to temporarily stabilize the upper levels.

Sweden
Approval has been granted in January 2022 for construction of direct disposal facility using the KBS-3 technology on the site of Forsmark nuclear power plant.

United Kingdom
The UK Government, in common with many other countries and supported by scientific advice, has identified permanent deep underground disposal as the most appropriate means of disposing of higher activity radioactive waste.

Radioactive Waste Management (RWM)  was established in 2014 to deliver a Geological Disposal Facility (GDF) and is a subsidiary of the Nuclear Decommissioning Authority (NDA)  which is responsible for clean-up of the UK's historical nuclear sites.

A GDF will be delivered through a community consent-based process , working in close partnership with communities, building trust for the long term and ensuring a GDF supports local interests and priorities.

The policy is emphatic in requiring the consent of the people who would be living alongside a GDF and giving them influence over the pace at which discussions progress.

The first Working Group were established in Copeland  and Allerdale  in Cumbria during late 2020 and early 2021. These Working Groups have started the process of manufacturing consent for hosting a GDF in their areas. These Working Groups are a critical step in the process to find a willing community and a suitable, feasible and acceptable site for a GDF.

RWM continues to have discussions in a range of places across England with people and organisations who are interested in exploring the benefits of hosting a GDF. More Working Groups are anticipated to form across the country in the next year or two.

Any proposal for a GDF will be evaluated against highly rigorous criteria  to ensure all safety and security tests are met.

United States

The Waste Isolation Pilot Plant (WIPP) in the United States went into service in 1999 by putting the first cubic metres of transuranic radioactive waste in a deep layer of salt near Carlsbad, New Mexico.

In 1978, the U.S. Department of Energy began studying Yucca Mountain, within the secure boundaries of the Nevada Test Site in Nye County, Nevada, to determine whether it would be suitable for a long-term geologic repository for spent nuclear fuel and high-level radioactive waste. This project faced significant opposition and suffered delays due to litigation by the Agency for Nuclear Projects for the State of Nevada (Nuclear Waste Project Office) and others. The Obama Administration rejected use of the site in the 2009 United States Federal Budget proposal, which eliminated all funding except that needed to answer inquiries from the Nuclear Regulatory Commission, "while the Administration devises a new strategy toward nuclear waste disposal."

On March 5, 2009, Energy Secretary Steven Chu told a Senate hearing the Yucca Mountain site is no longer viewed as an option for storing reactor waste.

In June 2018, the Trump administration and some members of Congress again began proposing using Yucca Mountain, with senators from Nevada raising opposition.

On February 6, 2020, U.S. President Donald Trump tweeted about a potential change of policy on plans to use Yucca Mountain in Nevada as a repository for nuclear waste. Trump's previous budgets have included funding for Yucca Mountain but, according to Nuclear Engineering International, two senior administration officials said that the latest spending blueprint will not include any money for licensing the project. On February 7, Energy Secretary Dan Brouillette echoed Trump's sentiment and stated that the US administration may investigate other types of [nuclear] storage, such as interim or temporary sites in other parts of the country.

Though no formal plan had solidified from the federal government, the private sector is moving forward with their own plans. Holtec International submitted a license application to the US Nuclear Regulatory Commission (NRC) for an autonomous consolidated interim storage facility in southeastern New Mexico in March 2017, which the NRC expects to issue its final environmental impact statement on by March 2021. Similarly, Interim Storage Partners is also planning to build and operate a consolidated interim storage facility in Andrews County, Texas, which the NRC plans to complete their review of in May 2021. Meanwhile, other companies have indicated that they are prepared to bid on an anticipated procurement from the DOE to design a facility for interim storage of nuclear waste.

Deep Isolation company proposed a solution involving horizontal storage of radioactive waste canisters in directional boreholes, using technology developed for oil and gas mining. An 18" borehole is directed vertically to the depth of several thousands feet in geologically stable formations, then horizontal waste disposal section is created of similar length where waste canisters are stored and then borehole is sealed.

See also 

Journey to the Safest Place on Earth
 List of nuclear waste treatment technologies
 Waste Isolation Pilot Plant
 Nuclear semiotics

References

External links 

 Study by the World Nuclear Organization
 Sandia Report Granite Disposal of U.S. High-Level Radioactive Waste
 Sandia Report Salt Disposal of Heat-Generating Nuclear Waste

Radioactive waste
Nuclear reactors
Radioactive waste repositories
Subterranea (geography)